Chikeluba Francis "Chico" Ofoedu  (born 12 November 1992) is a Nigerian football forward who plays for Hapoel Ashdod.

Club career

Enugu Rangers 
Ofoedu scored 12 goals for Nigeria Premier League team Enugu Rangers in the 2012 season.

1461 Trabzon 
On the summer of 2012, Chico joined 1461 Trabzon on a season-long loan deal. He played a total of 33 games while scoring 8 goals and assisting 3 goals.

karsiyaka 
His impressive performance during his loan spell at 1461 Trabzon saw him join Karsiyaka the following season.

Samsunsunspor 
In January 2015, he joined Samsunspor as a free agent. He went on to score a total of 21 goals in 49 games while providing 8 assists.

Eskisehirspor 
He joined Eskisehirspor in the summer of 2016. He played an important role in his first season in the team as they finished third in the Turkey 1. Lig which has been their best position in recent years. His outstanding form in the following season made him a top priority for the Israeli club, Maccabi Tel Aviv.

Maccabi Tel Aviv 
On 17 July 2018, Maccabi Tel Aviv announced his signing on a 2-year deal. He scored his debut goal for the club on 19 August 2018 in their 4-1 win against Hapoel Tel Aviv in the Toto League Cup semi final. They were crowned Israeli champions during his two years' spell at the club.

Sagan Tosu 
On January 20 2021, Sagan Tosu announced his signing from Maccabi Tel Aviv. His debut goal for the club came in a League Cup match against Kashima Antlers on April 29, 2021. He got his league debut on 24 July, 2021.

Honours

Club
Maccabi Tel Aviv
Israeli Premier League: 2018–19, 2019–20
Toto Cup: 2018–19

References

External links
 

1992 births
Living people
Nigerian footballers
Association football forwards
Rangers International F.C. players
1461 Trabzon footballers
Karşıyaka S.K. footballers
Samsunspor footballers
Eskişehirspor footballers
Maccabi Tel Aviv F.C. players
Sagan Tosu players
Hapoel Ashdod F.C. players
TFF First League players
Israeli Premier League players
J1 League players
Nigerian expatriate footballers
Expatriate footballers in Turkey
Expatriate footballers in Israel
Expatriate footballers in Japan
Nigerian expatriate sportspeople in Turkey
Nigerian expatriate sportspeople in Israel
Nigerian expatriate sportspeople in Japan
Footballers from Enugu